Idioptera is a genus of crane fly in the family Limoniidae.

Distribution
Europe & North America.

Species
I. fasciolata (Osten Sacken, 1869)
I. linnei Oosterbroek, 1992
I. mcclureana (Alexander, 1938)
I. nearctica (Alexander, 1966)
I. pulchella (Meigen, 1830)

References

Limoniidae
Nematocera genera
Diptera of Europe
Diptera of North America
Taxa named by Pierre-Justin-Marie Macquart